Vidal is a surname and given name.

Vidal may also refer to:

Places
Parque Vidal, Santa Clara, Cuba
Saint-Vidal, France
Valle Vidal, New Mexico, United States
Vidal, California, United States
Vidal Ramos, Brazil
Vidal Rock, near Greenwich Island, South Shetland Islands
Vidal Valley, California, United States

Other uses
HMS Vidal, a Royal Navy survey ship
Vidal blanc, a white wine grape